The Emblem of the State Government of Maharashtra is the official seal of the government of the Indian state of Maharashtra.

Design
The emblem is a circular seal depicting a Samai diya lamp surrounded by 16 lotus blossoms. Between the Samai lamp and lotus blossoms is a motto in Sanskrit, प्रतिपच्चंद्रलेखेव वर्धिष्णुर्विश्व वंदिता महाराष्ट्रस्य राज्यस्य मुद्रा भद्राय राजते, (Pratipaccandralēkhēva vardhiṣṇurviśva vanditā mahārāṣṭrasya rājyasya mudrā bhadrāya rājatē), which translates as "The glory of this seal of the State Government of Maharashtra will grow like the first day moon. It will be worshipped by the world and will shine only for the well being of its people". The motto is based on one found on the "Rajmudra" (royal seal) used by 17th-century Maratha king Chhatrapati Shivaji, the only difference being that the name of the monarch is replaced by the name of the state.

Historic emblems

Former princely states in Maharashtra

State government banner
The Government of Maharashtra can be represented by a banner displaying the emblem of the state on a white field.

See also
 National Emblem of India
 List of Indian state emblems
 Coat of arms of Mumbai

References

Government of Maharashtra
Maharashtra
Symbols of Maharashtra